The Swedish Basketball League MVP award is an annual award that is handed out to the most valuable player in the Swedish Basketball League (SBL), which is the highest tier of professional basketball in the country of Sweden. The award was first introduced in the 1992–93 season. Formerly, it was named the Basketligan MVP.

Winners

References

Basketball most valuable player awards
European basketball awards
Basketligan awards